Pakistan International Airlines Flight 326 was hijacked by the militant insurgency group Al-Zulfiqar, led by Murtaza Bhutto, in March 1981. The hijacking went on for thirteen days, starting on the 2nd of March, and ending on the 15th. It was a routine flight scheduled from Karachi to Peshawar, but the hijackers diverted it to Kabul, Afghanistan, and then Damascus, where the hostage situation ended with the release of prisoners by the Pakistani government.

Details
Al-Zulfiqar and PSF activist Salamullah Tipu and three other militants hijacked the plane. 

The hijackers demanded that 54 political prisoners be released. These included PPP, PSF, NSF and some Marxist Jiyala activists.  Zia-ul-Haq hesitated and Tipu executed Major Tariq Rahim, whom he mistakenly believed to be the son of then-martial law administrator General Rahimuddin Khan on the plane accusing him of being a part of Zia's coup against Bhutto.

Some passengers were let off, but others were not, most notably Major Tariq Rahim, who Murtaza felt had abandoned his father Zulfiqar Ali Bhutto. The Pakistani diplomat was shot, and his body was thrown onto the tarmac. At first, the Zia-ul-Haq regime resisted negotiating with the hijackers. However, they eventually gave in, and released more than 50 prisoners, which included members of PPP, PSF, and NSF.

The plane was first forced to land at Kabul airport, and was then flown to Damascus. Although undertaken to 'avenge Zulfiqar Ali Bhutto's hanging by Zia', the hijacking was at once condemned by the young co-chairperson of the PPP, Benazir Bhutto, who was languishing in a Karachi jail.

Around 50 prisoners were eventually released by the Zia-ul-Haq regime. Tipu was thrown in a Kabul prison and eventually executed in 1984 for murdering an Afghan national. His body was never returned, and he is said to have been buried somewhere near Kabul.

Aftermath
The successful hijacking not only saw many of the released men join AZO, but the organization also welcomed a whole new batch of recruits who travelled across Pakistan's tribal areas and entered Afghanistan.

AZO described itself as a socialist guerrilla outfit, but its main purpose was avenging Bhutto's death. The organization was mostly made up of young PSF militants, and members of small left-wing groups such as the Communist Mazdoor Kissan Party.

One of the three American hostages on the flight, Fred Hubbell, ran for the position of governor of the state of Iowa in the 2018 election.

Flight attendant Naila Nazir was awarded the Flight Safety Foundation Heroism Award in 1985 for refusing to flee the airliner when the hijackers boarded the plane.

References 

Aircraft hijackings
1981 murders in Asia
1981 in Pakistan
1981 in Afghanistan
Afghanistan–Pakistan relations
Pakistan International Airlines accidents and incidents
Military government of Pakistan (1977–1988)
Al-Zulfiqar
Aircraft hijackings in Pakistan
1980s murders in Afghanistan
1981 crimes in Afghanistan
Accidents and incidents involving the Boeing 707